Sabrina Island was an islet formed during the months of June and July 1811 by a submarine volcanic eruption off the coast of Ponta da Ferraria, São Miguel Island, Azores. The first person to land on the island was Commander James Tillard, captain of the British warship , who hoisted the Union Jack on the island and claimed sovereignty for Great Britain. A diplomatic row with Portugal over the issue ensued, which the island's sinking back into the sea rendered moot.

History

Formation and discovery
Between January and February 1811 a prolonged period of seismic activity affected the settlements to the extreme southeast of São Miguel, in particular in the parishes of Ginetes and Mosteiros. During these months, gases emitted from the ocean around Ponta da Ferraria, but by the end of February they abruptly ceased. New tremors returned in May and June, destroying many homes in Ginetes.

On 12 June, the eruption was seen from the British sloop-of-war HMS Sabrina, which was patrolling the Azores due to the then ongoing Peninsular War. Commander James Tillard, thinking the smoke from the eruption was a naval battle, sailed to the area but found a situation quite different than he imagined. He later wrote a description of the eruption and his visit to the island of Sabrina for the Philosophical Transactions of the Royal Society.

The next morning, 13 June,  HMS Sabrina landed in Ponta Delgada as Tillard had a pre-appointed meeting with William Harding Read, British consul general to the Azores. Read informed Tillard of the multiple earthquakes felt on São Miguel, especially in Ginetes and Mosteiros, which had caused panic among the island's residents. On 14 June Tillard desired to approach the eruption zone again by sea but wind conditions disallowed it, so instead he rode to Ginetes by horse, where he was able to observe the eruption from land. As Tillard lunched by the coast in Ginetes, seismic activity was so intense it caused a landslide destroying part of the cliff nearest him.

Tillard, even more enthusiastic, sailed HMS Sabrina toward the eruption area on the night of 15 June, but weak winds still kept him from approaching as closely as he hoped.

Again on 18 June HMS Sabrina approached the eruption zone. Tillard christened the newly-formed island Sabrina after his ship. 

The ship's crew unsuccessfully attempted a closer approach of the island, after which they returned to port in Ponta Delgada.

Diplomatic row between Great Britain and Portugal
On 4 July, the eruption appeared to stop and constant tremors—felt in Ginetes since May—ceased. In fair weather Sabrina finally approached the new island. Tillard and Read landed on the island, planted the Union Jack, and formally claimed the island for Great Britain and King George III.

This claim caused a diplomatic conflict with the Kingdom of Portugal, as the Azores were under Portuguese sovereignty and had been since their discovery. This was compounded by the fact England and Portugal have been allies continuously since at least 1386. In fact, as previously noted, Sabrina was in the Azores because Britain was assisting Portugal in the Peninsular War.

Because of the war, the Portuguese government and monarchy had relocated to Rio de Janeiro, Brazil. As they were dependent on British aid against the French, they did not pursue the issue with too much zeal. The conflict petered out naturally by October of 1811, by which time water erosion had dismantled the new island, as is often the case with islands formed by certain types of volcanic eruptions.

Legacy
A member of HMS Sabrinas crew, Colonel John William Miles, drew Sabrina Island during the 19 June 1811 approach. His work is today exhibited at the National Maritime Museum in Greenwich, England, United Kingdom.

The eruption garnered international scientific interest and commentary at the time. Among others, Charles Darwin wrote a letter regarding the incident. 

A similar occurrence and diplomatic spat took place in 1831 in the Mediterranean Sea off the coast of Sicily. After a volcanic eruption formed an island, Great Britain claimed it as Graham Island. The ensuing four-way territorial dispute between Great Britain, France, Spain, and the Kingdom of the Two Sicilies ultimately resolved as the Sabrina Island conflict had.

Geography
The cone was similar in form to the existing Islet of Vila Franca do Campo, with an open ring to the northwest. From the central ring debris escaped into the sea.

Because of water erosion, islands formed by submarine volcanic activity often have short, ephemeral existences, especially if they are formed of uncompacted tephra.

Volcanic activity continues: volcanic gases can still be seen rising to the surface.

In Literature
The appearance of this island inspired Lydia Sigourney's playful poem , published in her 1827 volume of poetry.

See also
 Graham Island (Mediterranean Sea)
 Surtsey

Notes

Sources
 
 
 
 

São Miguel Island
Ephemeral islands
Disputed islands
Former islands
Islets of the Azores
Uninhabited islands of Portugal